Coreglia Antelminelli is a comune (municipality) in the Province of Lucca in the Italian region Tuscany, located about  northwest of Florence and about  north of Lucca.

Coreglia Antelminelli borders the following municipalities: Abetone Cutigliano, Bagni di Lucca, Barga, Borgo a Mozzano, Fiumalbo, Gallicano, Pievepelago.

Main sights
Church of San Martino
Church of Saints Peter and Paul
Church of Santa Maria Assunta

References

External links
 Official website

Cities and towns in Tuscany